Belmont is a village in southern inland Saint Vincent, in Saint Vincent and the Grenadines. It is located to the east of the capital,  Kingstown and northwest of Stubbs.

References

Scott, C. R. (ed.) (2005) Insight guide: Caribbean (5th edition). London: Apa Publications.

Populated places in Saint Vincent and the Grenadines